Phylis K. King (born May 8, 1946 in Ogden, Utah) is a Democratic Idaho State Representative since 2006 representing District 18 Seat B.

Education
King graduated from Grand Junction High School and earned her bachelor's degree in microbiology from Colorado State University.

Elections
On September 6, 2017 King announced that she will retire after the 2018 session of the Idaho Legislature. Earlier that year, she encouraged Tommy Ahlquist to run as a Democrat in a public letter.

2016 
King was unopposed for both the Democratic primary and the general election.

2014 
Unopposed for the Democratic primary.

King defeated Domenico Gelsomino with 63.8% of the vote.

2012 
Unopposed for the Democratic primary.

King defeated Brad R. Bolicek with 56.2% of the vote.

2010 
Unopposed for the Democratic primary.

King won the general election with 6,886 votes (53.8%) against Trevor Grigg (R).

2008 
Unopposed for the Democratic primary.

King won the three-part general election with 9,564 votes (50.9%) against Republican nominee Becky Young and Libertarian nominee James Oyler.

2006 
Unopposed for the Democratic primary, King won with 940 votes.

King won the general election with 7,240 votes (52.53%) against Julie Ellsworth.

Ellsworth later returned to the Idaho House of Representatives in the District 18 A seat, with the two serving together.

2004 
King won the May 25, 2004, Democratic primary with 493 votes (53.82%) against Cara Walker.

Turnout increased by over 4,000 but King lost to Ellsworth in the November 2, 2004, general election.

2002 
Unopposed for the Democratic primary.

King lost the general election to incumbent Republican Representative Julie Ellsworth.

References

External links
Phylis K. King at the Idaho Legislature
 

1946 births
Living people
Colorado State University alumni
Democratic Party members of the Idaho House of Representatives
People from Boise, Idaho
Politicians from Ogden, Utah
Women state legislators in Idaho
21st-century American politicians
21st-century American women politicians